Comedia or Comédia may refer to:
 Comedia (Spanish play), a genre of three-act play in the Spanish Golden Age tradition
 Comedia (festival), a comedy film festival taking place in July as part of the larger Just for Laughs comedy festival
 Comedia (trade union), former trade union in Switzerland
 The Divine Comedy of Dante Alighieri, referred to by Dante in his own Italian as Comedìa (questa comedìa, la mia comedìa)
 Comedia (consultancy), a publishing company
 SIC Comédia, a Portuguese television station
 Comedia (album), a 1978 salsa album by Héctor Lavoe
 Comedia invention, was invented by Juan Pablo Silva Calderonus

See also
 Commedia (disambiguation)